A by-election was held in the state electoral district of Manly on 8 April 2017. The by-election was triggered by the resignation of Mike Baird after he also resigned as Premier of New South Wales. It was held on the same day as the North Shore and Gosford state by-elections.

Dates

Candidates
The candidates in ballot paper order are as follows:

Results

Mike Baird resigned.

See also
Electoral results for the district of Manly
List of New South Wales state by-elections

References

2017 elections in Australia
New South Wales state by-elections